Jack Plunkett (5 January 1911 – 16 December 1985) was an Australian rules footballer who played with Geelong in the Victorian Football League (VFL).

Plunkett was just 17 when he debuted in the 1928 VFL season. He was Geelong's leading goal-kicker in 1929, with 29 goals, six of which game in a win over Fitzroy.

Plunkett later served in the Australian Army during World War II.

References

External links
 
 

1911 births
1985 deaths
Geelong Football Club players
Australian rules footballers from Geelong
Australian military personnel of World War II
Military personnel from Victoria (Australia)